Velyki Makary  is a village in Yavoriv Raion, Lviv Oblast, Ukraine. It belongs to Yavoriv urban hromada, one of the hromadas of Ukraine. As of the 2001 census, the population was 206.

References

External links
 Official Information (Ukrainian)

Villages in Yavoriv Raion